Loch Lubnaig (Loch Lùbnaig in Gaelic) is a small freshwater loch near Callander in the Stirling council area, Scottish Highlands. It lies in the former county of Perthshire. It is part of the Loch Lomond and The Trossachs National Park.

The loch nestles in the space between Ben Ledi and Ben Vorlich. Fed by the River Balvaig from the north and drained by the Garbh Uisge to the south, Loch Lubnaig offers fishing from the shore while canoes can be rented at the north end. Alternatively, two car parking areas on the east shore offer perfect, albeit sometimes busy, canoe launching points.

The route of the former Callander and Oban Railway runs along the west shore of the loch.

The name is derived from the Gaelic Lùbnaig, meaning crooked. Like many lochs of the Highlands, the name is almost identical to its Gaelic version.

Bathymetrical survey

Loch Lubnaig differs from other lochs in its neighbourhood in that it does not constitute a single basin. The bottom is irregular; the contour lines of depth do not follow the contour of the loch. Hollows and ridges alternate with each other and in some places, deep water is found close to the shore, while in other places shallow water extends a considerable distance from shore. The loch is narrow and shallow considering its size, comparatively speaking, nearly two-thirds of the area being under  in depth. The loch may be considered into two halves, defined by the central constriction in the outline of the loch at the entrance of the Ardchillarie burn, where the bottom shallows and separates two principal deep depressions. The northern half trends in a north-west and south-east direction, while the southern half trends almost directly north and south.

There are three other smaller depressions.

Gallery

References

External links

Lubnaig
Loch Lubnaig
Lubnaig
LLubnaig